The  was a large caliber anti-aircraft gun developed by the Imperial Japanese Army during the final days of World War II. The Type 5 number was designated for the year the gun was accepted, 2605 in the Japanese imperial year calendar, or 1945 in the Gregorian calendar. It was intended to replace the earlier Type 3 12 cm AA Gun as a defense against American air raids.

History and development
In order to address the shortcomings of the Type 88 75 mm AA gun, the Army Technical Bureau developed a larger version with superior range, designated the Type 3. It was one of the few weapons in the Japanese inventory capable of reaching the USAAF B-29 Superfortress bombers that were attacking cities and other targets in the Japanese home islands. However, by late 1943 it became apparent that the B-29 was capable of flying at altitudes in excess of 10,000 meters, beyond the effective ceiling of the Type 3 12 cm gun.

An emergency project was initiated in December 1943, to address this issue. To save time, the existing Type 3 design was scaled up to 15 centimeters in caliber, with a corresponding increase in range and firepower. The project was completed relatively quickly, with test guns ready for firing 17 months after the project starting. However, by this point it was already too late — all major Japanese cities had been destroyed by the strategic bombing campaign against Japan, and American bombers were moving onto secondary targets. Japan lacked the raw materials and industrial infrastructure to follow through with mass production. Only two units of the powerful new Type 5 were completed before the surrender of Japan. One unit each was produced by the Army’s Osaka Arsenal and by Japan Steel Works.

Design
The Type 5 15 cm AA gun had a single piece gun barrel with sliding breech, mounted on a central pedestal. The guns were not mobile, requiring deployment in fixed positions.

Combat record
Coming into service at the end of the war, the two Type 5s completed were retained on the home islands as part of the bolstering of Japan's defenses against Allied air raids and against the perceived threat of Allied invasion. These two guns were deployed to Kugayama, Suginami ward in the outskirts of Tokyo. In a single engagement on 1 August 1945, they brought down two B-29 Superfortress bombers. American bombing raids, however, avoided Kugayama after the incident and as a result the guns had no subsequent chance to fire.

Effectiveness
A postwar American report evaluated the effectiveness of Japanese anti-aircraft fire. The report demonstrated that the Type 5 15 cm AA gun was more than five times more effective than the Type 3 12 cm AA gun, and that the engagement envelope was considerably larger.

The guns were deployed with a dedicated Type 2 electronic fire control system, with an above ground optical tracker and a targeting computer installed in a nearby bunker, this was linked electronically to the gun's fire control director, allowing precise target tracking.

References
 Bishop, Chris (eds) The Encyclopedia of Weapons of World War II. Barnes & Nobel. 1998. 
 Chant, Chris. Artillery of World War II, Zenith Press, 2001, 
 McLean, Donald B. Japanese Artillery; Weapons and Tactics. Wickenburg, Ariz.: Normount Technical Publications 1973. .
 Mayer, S.L. The Rise and Fall of Imperial Japan. The Military Press (1884) 
 US Department of War, TM 30-480, Handbook on Japanese Military Forces, Louisiana State University Press, 1994. 
 War Department TM-E-30-480 Handbook on Japanese Military Forces September 1944

Notes

External links
 Taki's Imperial Japanese Army
  REPORTS OF THE U. S. NAVAL TECHNICAL MISSION TO JAPAN

Artillery of Japan
World War II anti-aircraft guns
5
5
150 mm artillery
Weapons and ammunition introduced in 1945